Greene-Rose Heritage Park is a park in Cambridge, Massachusetts, United States. Opened in 2008, the park is located along Harvard Street, near the intersection with Moore Street. It has a playground and tennis courts.

It is the location of Cambridge's second Miyawaki forest, planted in November 2022.

References

External links
 

2008 establishments in Massachusetts
Geography of Cambridge, Massachusetts
Parks in Massachusetts
Protected areas established in 2008
Tourist attractions in Cambridge, Massachusetts